Mother Teresa of Cats is a Polish drama film directed by Paweł Sala. The premiere was held on 6 July 2010 at the 45th Karlovy Vary International Film Festival in the Czech Republic and on 17 September 2010 in Poland.

Plot 
A shocking record of a crime committed by two young boys (12 and 22 years old), committing the murder of their own mother. The film shows a period of 12 months before their arrest, especially the last few days and the time of the investigation until arrested by the Police. The author does not focus on the sensational theme, but tries to focus on the psychological layer, recreating the atmosphere of the family home, psychological portraits of the brothers and their mother – the future victim. In the background we see the environment in which this thoroughly ordinary, modest family lived. There was no indication that there would be a tragedy. There will be no cruelty or brutal literality in this film, yet the author does not resign from the artistic means of sensational and criminal cinema. The film's script is based on facts.

Cast 

  as Teresa
  as Hubert, husband of Teresa
 Mateusz Kościukiewicz as Artur, son of Teresa
 Filip Garbacz as Marcin, son of Teresa
 Monika Pikuła as Ewa, Teresa's cousin
 Ewa Szykulska as Krystyna, Teresa's friend
 Janusz Chabior as Jacek
 Małgorzata Łata as Jadzia, daughter of Teresa
 Helena Norowicz as Aunt Róża
 Janusz Łagodziński as Therapist
 Łukasz Simlat as Broker
 Beata Fido as Marcin's teacher
 Piotr Dąbrowski as Colonel
 Marek Serdiukow as Policeman, neighbor
 Marta Dobecka as Wiktoria
 Małgorzata Sadowska as a policewoman on duty
 Grzegorz Mostowicz-Gerszt as district police officer
 Antoni Gryzik as Zygmunt
 Kamil Przystał 
 Sebastian Pawlak
 Wojan Trocki
 Robert Olech
 Wojciech Żołądkowicz
 Wojciech Czerwiński
 Marta Linkowska
 Małgorzata Studniarek
 Justyna Straszyńska
 Beata Urbańska
 Mieczysław Chmielewski
 Gennady Chamzyryn
 Krzysztof Rybakowski
 Gerard Łaski
 Robert Dzwonkowski
 Jarosław Szlęcy
 Michał Wołkowicki
 Artur Bekus
 Jakub Mićka
 Kamil Myszka
 Grzegorz Banasik
 Piotr Witkowski
 Damian Wijas
 Rafał Kłosowski
 Wiktor Wandzel
 Adam Nowak
 Dariusz Bąk
 Jakub Bossowski
 Adam Szymański
 Michał Sekunda
 Robert Wandzel
 Piotr Kruszewski

Festival and awards

Wins (4) 

 International Film Festival Karlovy Vary 2010
 Individual Award – Best Actor: Filip Garbacz
 Individual Award – Best Actor: Mateusz Kościukiewicz
 Koszalin Film Debut Festival "Youth and Film" 2010
 director: Paweł Sala
 feature film
 "Wisła" Polish Film Festival in Russia 2010
 Elephant (org. Słoń) – distinction

Nominations (12) 

 Polish Golden Film Festival in Gdynia "Golden Lions"
 Participation in the main competition: Paweł Sala
 New Horizons International Film Festival in Wrocław 
 Competition: New Polish Films – Participation in the competition
 IFF of the Young Viewer "Ale Kino!"
 Golden Goats – International Jury – Participation in the competition of acting films
 Film Acting Festival Tadeusz Szymków 
 Golden Puppy – The best leading female role: Ewa Skibińska

 International Film Festival Karlovy Vary 2010
 Crystal Globe – Participation in the main competition: Paweł Sala
 Mastercard OFF CAMERA International Independent Cinema Festival 
 Polish Feature Film Competition – Participation in the competition: Paweł Sala
 Golden Ducks 2010 
 Golden Duck – Best actress of the 2009/2010 season: Ewa Skibińska 
 Golden Duck – Best actor of the 2009/2010 season: Mateusz Kościukiewicz
 Golden Duck – The best actor of the best films: Mateusz Kościukiewicz 
 Golden Duck – Best Actor of the Best Films: Filip Garbacz
 Golden Duck – Best cinematographer of the 2009/2010 season: Mikołaj Łepkowski 
 Golden Duck – Best screenwriter for the 2009/2010 season: Paweł Sala

References

Polish drama films
2010 films
2010 drama films